The 2000–01 NBA season was the 31st season of the National Basketball Association in Cleveland, Ohio. The Cavaliers had the eighth pick in the 2000 NBA draft, and selected Jamal Crawford from the University of Michigan, but soon traded him to the Chicago Bulls in exchange for top draft pick Chris Mihm. During the off-season, the team acquired Chris Gatling and Clarence Weatherspoon from the Miami Heat, Matt Harpring from the Orlando Magic, and Robert Traylor from the Milwaukee Bucks, while signing free agent Bimbo Coles. The Cavaliers got off to a strong start winning nine of their first twelve games, on their way to a solid 15–7 start. In January, they traded Brevin Knight to the Atlanta Hawks in exchange for former Ohio State star Jim Jackson. However, they would struggle and lose 23 of their next 28 games, including a ten-game losing streak between January and February, finishing 6th in the Central Division with a disappointing 30–52 record.

Second-year star Andre Miller led the team with 15.8 points, 8.0 assists and 1.5 steals per game, while Lamond Murray averaged 12.8 points per game, and Weatherspoon provided the team with 11.3 points, 9.7 rebounds and 1.3 blocks per game. In addition, Zydrunas Ilgauskas averaged 11.7 points, 6.7 rebounds and 1.5 blocks per game, but only played just 24 games due to continuing foot injuries, while Gatling provided with 11.4 points and 5.3 rebounds per game off the bench, Harpring contributed 11.1 points per game, and Mihm averaged 7.6 points and 4.7 rebounds per game, and was named to the NBA All-Rookie Second Team.

Following the season, Randy Wittman was fired as head coach, while Gatling was traded back to the Miami Heat, Jackson signed as a free agent with the Heat during the next season, Weatherspoon signed with the New York Knicks, and Harpring was traded along with Traylor to the Philadelphia 76ers, who then sent Traylor to the Charlotte Hornets.

Key Dates:

Offseason

Free Agents

Trades

Draft picks

 Crawford traded on draft day to Chicago for #7 pick Chris Mihm. Chicago traded the rights to C Chris Mihm to Cleveland for the rights to G Jamal Crawford and cash.
 2nd round pick (#37) traded to Denver in Greg Graham deal. Sent to Miami in Mark Strickland deal. Used to draft Eddie House.

Roster

Regular season

Standings

Record vs. opponents

Game log

October
Record: 1-0 ; Home: 0-0 ; Road: 1-0

November
Record: 8-5 ; Home: 6-1 ; Road: 2-4

December
Record: 7-7 ; Home: 4-2 ; Road: 3-5

January
Record: 4-11 ; Home: 3-4 ; Road: 1-7

February
Record: 2-10; Home: 1-6; Road: 1-4

March
Record: ; Home: ; Road:

April
Record: ; Home: ; Road:

Player stats

Regular season

Player Statistics Citation:

Awards and records

Awards

Records

Milestones

All-Star

Transactions

Trades

Free Agents

Development League

References

 Cleveland Cavaliers on Database Basketball
 Cleveland Cavaliers on Basketball Reference

Cleveland Cavaliers seasons
Cleve
Cleve